Calvert County, Maryland is the only jurisdiction in the U.S. state of Maryland that still has a 100% all-volunteer Fire, Rescue, and EMS service.  Currently none of the firefighters, EMTs, or paramedics in Calvert County are paid.  They are all 100% volunteers, who provide countless hours for extensive training and provide emergency services 24 hours a day, 365 days a year.  However, on January 20, 2018, the Calvert County Board of County Commissioners approved a phased-in approach of hiring paramedics, starting in FY 2019.

Calvert County Fire-Rescue-EMS (CCFEMS) (http://www.calvertfirerescueems.com) is dispatched by full-time paid dispatchers at the Calvert County Control Center.

Priority one medical calls, determined by the Control Center to be immediately life-threatening in nature, requires the dispatch of the closest fire engine, the two closest ambulances, and the Calvert County Advanced Life Support Paramedic Unit centrally located in Prince Frederick, Maryland.  If an ambulance fails to respond within 5 minutes, the third closest ambulance is dispatched as well. Since the ambulances are staffed only with an EMT-Basic and provide only basic life support level care, the centrally located paramedics respond in a Chevy Suburban or Ford Expedition and take command of the ambulance if the patient requires advanced life support Paramedic level care. This may occur on the scene or at a rendezvous en route to the hospital. If the EMT-Basics on the ambulance determine the patient is not suffering a life-threatening emergency and does not need a more advanced level of care, they may cancel the medic unit and continue to the hospital at the EMT-Basic level of care.

Priority two medical calls, determined by the Calvert county control center to be potentially life-threatening, dispatch the closest ambulance and the Calvert County Emergency Medical Services Advanced Life Support Paramedic Unit centrally located in Prince Frederick, Maryland. If an ambulance fails to respond within 5 minutes, the next closest ambulance is dispatched as well.

Priority three medical calls, determined by the Calvert County control center to be routine or non-emergency in nature, dispatch only the closest ambulance, although once on scene they may request a Paramedic unit to meet them en route to the hospital to upgrade their ambulance if the patient is suffering a true emergency.  If an ambulance fails to respond within 5 minutes, the next closest ambulance is dispatched as well. Units en route to a priority 3 call may be rerouted by the Control Center to a higher priority call if one should be received prior to arriving on scene.

Calvert County is served by six volunteer fire departments, one volunteer rescue squad, one volunteer dive team, and one volunteer Advanced Life Support Paramedic Unit, all largely funded by the Calvert County government.

Company 1 is the North Beach Volunteer Fire Department (http://www.northbeachfire.com/). North Beach has two engines, one tower, one heavy rescue, one brush truck, two basic life support ambulances, a boat, and a zodiac.

Company 2 is the Prince Frederick Volunteer Fire Department (http://www.pfvfd.org/). Prince Frederick has two engines, one tower, one heavy rescue squad, one tanker, and one brush truck.

Company 3 is the Solomons Volunteer Rescue Squad & Fire Department (http://www.svrsfd.org/). Solomons is the farthest from the hospital, and also heavily relies on paid EMS staffing; as the volunteers failed to respond on EMS and Fire Incidents.

Company 4 is the Prince Frederick Volunteer Rescue Squad (http://www.pfvrs.org/). It is separate from the PFVFD. PFVRS has two ambulances, a boat, and a zodiac.

Company 5 is the Dunkirk Volunteer Fire Department (http://www.dunkirk5.com).

Company 6 is the Huntingtown Volunteer Fire Department (http://www.hvfd6.org).

Company 7 is the St. Leonard Volunteer Fire Department (http://www.slvfd.org).

Company 10 is Calvert Advanced Life Support (CALS), or the Paramedic Unit (http://www.calvertals.net). They are the only advanced life support providers in the County and the last all volunteer ALS service in the State of Maryland. They are centrally located in Prince Frederick, and respond everywhere in the county with chase vehicles (Chevy Suburbans or Ford Expeditions) to upgrade local Basic Life Support (BLS) Ambulances that require a higher level of care for a seriously ill or injured patient.

Company 12 is the Calvert County Rescue Dive Team (http://www.ccrdt.org/).

There are no companies 8, 9, or 11.

References 
https://web.archive.org/web/20101104111110/http://www.co.cal.md.us/residents/safety/fire/

Calvert County, Maryland
Firefighters